Killing Technology is the third studio album by Canadian heavy metal band Voivod. It was released in 1987 on Noise Records and was the first to combine elements of progressive rock in the band's thrash metal sound. According to interviews contemporary to the release of Killing Technology, by 1986 Voivod were more influenced by hardcore punk and crossover bands than by other metal bands, with only Kreator and Motörhead still appreciated by all band members. Estimated sales are more than 60,000 copies worldwide.

A music video was made for the song "Ravenous Medicine".

The cassette and CD edition includes the two tracks from the Too Scared to Scream / Cockroaches single.

Track listing
All songs were written by Voivod. Lyrics by Snake.

Personnel
Voivod
Snake (Denis Bélanger) – vocals
Piggy (Denis D'Amour) – guitar, mixing assistant
Blacky (Jean-Yves Thériault) – bass, mixing assistant
Away (Michel Langevin) – drums, artwork

Production
Harris Johns – producer, engineer, mixing

References

1987 albums
Voivod (band) albums
Noise Records albums
Combat Records albums
Albums produced by Harris Johns